Trophon mawsoni is a species of sea snail, a marine gastropod mollusk in the family Muricidae, the murex snails or rock snails.

Distribution
It can be found off of New Zealand, mainly off of Ninety Mile Beach and North Island.

References

Gastropods described in 1957
Trophon